The 1873 Haverfordwest Boroughs by-election was fought on 24 November 1873.  The byelection was fought due to the incumbent MP of the Liberal Party, The Lord Kensington taking the position of Parliamentary Groom in Waiting.  It was retained by Edwardes.

References

1873 in Wales
1870s elections in Wales
1873 elections in the United Kingdom
By-elections to the Parliament of the United Kingdom in Welsh constituencies